Samson Lardy Anyenini is a Ghanaian lawyer He attended University of Ghana (LL. M) and Kwame Nkrumah University of Science and Technology (LL.B). He was a journalist who worked for Multimedia Ghana's Joy Fm till 2013. He hosts Joynews and Joy FM's weekend current affairs news analysis Newsfile programme. As a Broadcast Journalist, he was also a BBC correspondent reporting on a wide range of issues with emphasis on human rights cases.

Career 
He was appointed to serve as the Chairman of the Ghana Football Association Normalization Disciplinary Committee . He was invited to join the illustrious Supreme Court Justices due to his sound knowledge of the law, and his interest in constitutional matters and legal advocacy. He has represented, assisted and advised numerous clients on legal matters including a delegation of a dozen MPs and leaders of Ghana's 6th Parliament, famous corporate entities such NTHC Properties Limited, Multimedia Group Limited and African Origin Travels. He also conducted the case that saw the removal from office of the head of the CHRAJ in 2015. Samson was previously with Osu-based Gaisie Zwennes Hughes & Co.

He holds a Master degree of Laws in Alternative Dispute Resolution, his practice focus on International Commercial and Investment Arbitration. He is an Associate of the Chartered Institute of Arbitrators. He has consulted for and delivered special papers for professional institutions and special organizations including the Judicial Service of Ghana and the local chapter of global watchdog Ghana Integrity Initiative and Ghana Anti-Corruption Coalition, Ghana Centre for Democratic Development. He was recently invited to serve on the Board of the International Lawyers Assisting Workers (ILAW) Network.

Awards 
Samson won the Best Journalist for 2019 GIJ Annual Awards.

References 

Living people
Ghanaian journalists
Year of birth missing (living people)
Political journalists
Current affairs shows
Ghanaian broadcasters
Ghanaian radio presenters